C. J. is a given name or nickname and may refer to:

People
CJ (rapper) (born 1997), American rapper
C. J. Anderson (born 1991), American football player
C. J. Beathard (born 1993), American football quarterback for the San Francisco 49ers
C. J. Bott (born 1995), New Zealander footballer
C. J. Brewer (disambiguation), multiple people
C. J. Carella, RPG author
C. J. Chatham (born 1994), American professional baseball player
C. J. Cherryh (born 1942), American writer of speculative fiction
C. J. de Mooi (born 1969), British professional quizzer who appeared on BBC Television's Eggheads until 2012
C. J. Elleby (born 2000), American basketball player
C. J. Gardner-Johnson (born 1997), American football player
C. J. Harris (disambiguation), multiple people
CJ Hamilton, multiple people
C. J. Henderson (disambiguation), multiple people
CJ McCollum (born 1991), NBA basketball player
C. J. McLaughlin (born 1992), American racing driver
C. J. Miles (born 1987), NBA basketball player
C. J. Moore (born 1995), American football player
C. J. Nitkowski (born 1973), American baseball player
CJ Pearson (born 2002), American journalist and political commentator 
C. J. Perry (born 1985), professional wrestling manager under the ring name Lana
C. J. Ramone (born 1965), stage name of Christopher Joseph Ward, best known for working as the bassist and sometimes vocalist of the Ramones
C. J. Reavis (born 1995), American football player
C. J. Snare (born 1964), vocalist and keyboardist of FireHouse
CJ Stander (born 1990), South African rugby player in Ireland
C. J. Stroud (born 2001), American football player
CJ Ujah (born 1994), British sprinter
C. J. Verdell (born 1999), American football player
C. J. Watson (born 1984), American basketball player
C. J. Wildheart (born 1967), guitarist/vocalist with The Wildhearts and Honeycrack
C. J. Williams (born 1990), American basketball player in the Israeli Basketball Premier League

Fictional characters
C. J. Barnes, a fictional character on the television show 8 Simple Rules portrayed by David Spade
C. J. Cregg, fictional character on the television show The West Wing
Charles "C. J." Jefferson, a fictional character in The Fall and Rise of Reginald Perrin
Carl "C. J." Johnson, fictional main character of the video game Grand Theft Auto: San Andreas
C. J. Parker, fictional character on the television show Baywatch
C. J., a character from the Cartoon Network animated series Regular Show
Captain Jason "C.J." Stentley, police captain on the TV show Brooklyn Nine-Nine
Charles Whitman, CJ Whitman

See also
CJ (disambiguation)